Dead Man's Flats is a hamlet in Alberta within the Municipal District of Bighorn No. 8. Statistics Canada also recognizes it as a designated place under the name of Pigeon Mountain.

History 
A variety of explanations account for the origin of the hamlet's name. One explanation associates it with a murder which took place in 1904 at a dairy farm situated on the flats of the Bow River.  Francois Marret stood trial in Calgary for killing his brother Jean, whose body he had disposed of in the Bow River, but the jury acquitted him by reason of insanity. Another account states that two or three First Nations people who were illegally trapping beaver noticed a warden approaching in the distance. Knowing that they did not have time to flee without being spotted, they smeared themselves with beaver blood and pretended to be dead. The warden, fooled by their deception, ran for help. Meanwhile, the trappers took their beaver pelts and escaped. This account is regarded as dubious; for example, no known description of this incident appears in the official wardens' reports. 

In 1954, the Calgary Herald wrote that it was "named only 10 to 12 years ago after a man was found shot in a cabin in the area." However, the phrase "Dead Man's flat" (lower-case "f" without the plural "s" at the end) is used in the August 25th, 1924 edition of the Calgary Herald. In an article that describes some recent events in Canmore it is stated that "A party of Canmore boys...returned last week from a seven days' outing at Dead Man's flat." They went on the outing for the purpose of fishing.

From 1974 to 1985 the hamlet was officially called Pigeon Mountain Service Centre, but it changed its name to Dead Man's Flats in 1985 to encourage tourism. The new name had been unofficially used to designate the hamlet for several decades prior.

Before the Trans-Canada highway was constructed through the area in the 1950s, it was sparsely populated Crown land; among the only structures in the area were a corral and a camper's cabin. Proximity to the new national highway spurred the hamlet's development as a commercial service centre and rest stop for travelers and truck drivers. Businesses currently operating include motels, a Husky truck stop with a 24-hour diner, and the Mad Dog Café and Market. Recently the area has been the subject of proposed developments which would involve the construction of a new residential neighbourhood and a light industrial park.

Demographics 

See also 
List of communities in Alberta
List of designated places in Alberta
List of hamlets in Alberta

References 

Municipal District of Bighorn No. 8
Designated places in Alberta
Hamlets in Alberta